This is a list of settlements in Slovenia, starting with A.

References

Lists of populated places in Slovenia